Uncial 0292 (in the Gregory-Aland numbering), is a Greek uncial manuscript of the New Testament. Palaeographically it has been assigned to the 6th century.

Description 

The codex contains a part of the text of the Gospel of Mark 6:55-7:5, on one parchment leaf. The text is written in two columns per page, 18 lines per page, in uncial letters.

Currently it is dated by the INTF to the 6th century.

Location 

It is one of the manuscripts discovered in Saint Catherine's Monastery at Sinai in May 1975, during the restoration work.

Currently the codex is housed at the St. Catherine's Monastery (N.E. ΜΓ 2-4) in Sinai.

See also 

 List of New Testament uncials
 Biblical manuscript
 Textual criticism

References

Further reading 

 L. Politis, "Nouveaux manuscrits grecs decouvers au Mont Sinai. Raport preliminaire", Scriptorium 34, (1980), pp. 5–17.

Greek New Testament uncials
6th-century biblical manuscripts